
Gmina Zagnańsk is a rural gmina (administrative district) in Kielce County, Świętokrzyskie Voivodeship, in south-central Poland.

Villages
Gmina Zagnańsk contains the villages and settlements of Bartków, Belno, Borowa Góra, Chrusty, Długojów, Gruszka, Janaszów, Jasiów, Jaworze, Kajetanów, Kaniów, Kołomań, Lekomin, Osiedle Wrzosy, Samsonów, Samsonów-Ciągłe, Samsonów-Dudków, Samsonów-Komorniki, Samsonów-Piechotne, Ścięgna, Siodła, Szałas, Tumlin-Dąbrówka, Tumlin-Osowa, Tumlin-Węgle, Tumlin-Zacisze, Umer, Zabłocie, Zachełmie and Zagnańsk.

Neighbouring gminas
Gmina Zagnańsk is bordered by the gminas of Bliżyn, Łączna, Masłów, Miedziana Góra, Mniów and Stąporków.

References
Polish official population figures 2006

Zagnansk
Kielce County